William Lyttelton may refer to:

 William Lyttelton, 1st Baron Lyttelton (1724–1808), British peer
 William Lyttelton, 3rd Baron Lyttelton (1782–1837), British peer